The French-American School of New York (also known as the Lycée Franco-Américain de New York, or FASNY) is an international and bilingual independent school located in suburban Westchester County, New York. Since its founding in 1980, FASNY has evolved from a three-teacher, 17-student nursery to a school on three campuses that educates more than 780 students per year. FASNY offers an international and bilingual education to a population of local American families, French expatriates, French-American families, and international families representing more than 50 nationalities. The school offers education from Nursery (3 years old) to 12th grade at three campuses in Larchmont and Mamaroneck, New York. FASNY is accredited by the New York State Association of Independent Schools, the International Baccalaureate Organization, and the French Ministry of Education. Sixty-nine percent of students are of French origin, 21% are American, and 10% hail from countries in the francophone world.

History

Early History 
The French-American School of New York was founded in 1980 to provide a bilingual education to students. Located in the building of a former Catholic school in Larchmont, New York, the school employed two teachers and provided education at the nursery school, kindergarten, and first grade level, with the intent to add one grade per year as the time progressed. In November 1980, the then-nineteen-student school received a provisional charter from the New York State Regents. The school's original students included students of American, French, Canadian, Chinese, and Vietnamese descent.

Enrollment in the French-American School of New York expanded rapidly in its first several years. While the school started with sixteen students on its rolls, the school had enrolled twenty-six students by the end of its first academic year. The school expanded rapidly going into its second academic year, enrolling forty-nine students at it onset and adding a second grade classroom. By January 1982, the school had seventy students on its rolls and announced plans to add both a third and fourth grade classroom by the onset of its fourth academic year. By the end of its third academic year, the school had increased its enrollment to 128 students. The size of its student population further increased by the start of its fourth academic year to about 185 students.

Campuses
 Manor (Nursery-Grade 3) - 111 Larchmont Avenue,  Larchmont, NY 10538 
 Village (Grades 4–8) - 145 New Street,  Mamaroneck, NY 10543 
 Harbor (Grades 9-12 and Administrative Offices) - 320 East Boston Post Road, Mamaroneck, NY 10543

See also
 Agence pour l'enseignement français à l'étranger, the Wikipedia article on French education abroad
 Education in France
 American School of Paris - an American international school in France

References

External links
 

Larchmont, New York
Mamaroneck, New York
French-American culture in New York (state)
Private K-12 schools in Westchester County, New York
International schools in New York (state)
AEFE accredited schools
French international schools in the United States